Sigobert the Lame (also Sigibert or Sigebert) (died c. 509) was a  king of the Franks in the area of Zülpich and Cologne. His father's name was "Childebert". He was presumably wounded in the knee at the Battle of Tolbiac against the Alamanni.

According to Gregory of Tours, he was murdered by his son Chlodoric upon the instigation of Clovis I, sometime after his victory over the Visigoths (507), when his son sent assassins upon him as he took a sojourn from his kingdom to a nearby forest. Chlodorich then told Clovis of the murder and offered him the finest treasures of his newly inherited kingdom as a symbol of their new alliance. Clovis sent messengers to assess the treasure, who then asked Chlodoric to plunge his hand as deeply into his gold coins as possible. With his arm submerged, the envoys of Clovis then killed the new king in betrayal. Clovis then stood before the people of Chlodoric and told them that the son had sent assassins to murder his father, but that Chlodoric had subsequently met his own end as well. Clovis then offered his protection to the former subjects of Sigobert and Chlodoric, and thus became their king.

Gregory suggests that Chlodoric was murdered in the same campaign that killed the Frankish  King Chararic. Before, Clovis had killed Ragnachar and his brothers.

After all these murders, Gregory tells us that Clovis lamented that he had no family left, implying that among his own casualties were close relatives.

References

Gregory of Tours. The History of the Franks. 2 vol. trans. O. M. Dalton. Oxford: Clarendon Press, 1967.

509 deaths
Year of birth unknown
Frankish warriors
Royalty and nobility with disabilities
6th-century Frankish kings